Vasa IFK (VIFK) is a Finnish football club, located in Vaasa. It was founded in 1900. The club changed its name in 1988 after a merger with another club, BK-48, and was called BK-IFK during the late 1900s. The name was changed back to VIFK in year 2000.

Their representative team moved up to Ykkönen at end of season 2005 which is the second-highest level in Finland. The visit lasted three years and the team was relegated to Kakkonen after finishing 12th place in the 2008 season.

The club has a great history, but has yet to achieve the same kind of success as in the mid-20th century. Vasa IFK have won the Finnish championship three times, in 1944, 1946 and 1953. They were runners-up in 1945 and 1951 and finished third in 1950 and 1955. In 1947 and 1948, Vasa IFK also won the league hosted by the FA. In that time there were two separate leagues due to political circumstances. The other league was hosted by the organisation for the labour clubs, TUL.

The club has also been active in women's football and other sports. In 1949 and in 1964 VIFK was the runner-up for the Finnish championship in bandy.

The current chairman of the club is Henrik Skytte.

Current squad

Achievements 
 Finnish Premier League:
 Winners (3): 1944, 1946, 1953
 Runners-up (2): 1951, 1952

Season to season 

21 seasons in Veikkausliiga
24 seasons in Ykkönen
32 seasons in Kakkonen
10 season in Kolmonen
1 seasons in Nelonen

References

External links 
 

Football clubs in Finland
Defunct bandy clubs in Finland
Vaasa
Sport in Vaasa
Association football clubs established in 1900
Bandy clubs established in 1900
1900 establishments in Finland